The 2016 presidential campaign of Darrell Castle, lawyer and 2008 Vice Presidential nominee of the Constitution Party began on the eve of the Constitution Party National Convention in April 2016. On April 16, the Constitution Party nominated Castle on the first ballot after he won 184 votes out of the 339.5 cast to win the nomination with 54.19%. His running mate, Scott Bradley, was nominated by voice vote. In his acceptance speech, Castle stated that he wanted to speak to the American public,

Six days after the Convention, he formally filed with the Federal Election Commission (FEC).

The Constitution Party of Idaho nominated Scott Copeland of Texas for President and J.R. Myers of Alaska for Vice President in 2016 instead of Castle and Bradley, who were put on the ballot with no party affiliation. The Copeland-Myers ticket received 2,381 votes in Idaho to 4,403 votes cast for Castle.

On Election Day, Castle finished with 172,570 votes to finish in 6th place, with just under 300,000 votes less than Evan McMullin's campaign. They did however gain 50,000 more votes than the previous Constitution Party ticket (Goode/Clymer) four years prior, with their 0.15% being better than the previous campaign's 0.09% of the vote.

Background

Castle was a commissioned officer in the U.S. Marine Corps for four years and operator of the law firm Darrell Castle and Associates since 1984. Darrell Castle has held many positions in the Constitution Party such as Vice-Chairman and the Chairman of the Platform Committee. In the 2008 election Darrell Castle was selected as the vice-presidential (VP) nominee on the Chuck Baldwin campaign in 2008 after winning the Vice-Presidential vote by 75.8%. After losing the Constitution Party nomination to Virgil Goode four years later and receiving only 30% of the votes, Castle became the nominee the following cycle. Castle is the second VP nominee from the Party to later run as the Presidential nominee, the first since 2008.

Ballot access

The campaign has ballot access in Alaska, Arkansas, Colorado, Florida, Hawaii, Idaho, Iowa, Louisiana, Michigan, Minnesota, Mississippi, Missouri, Nevada (as the Independent American Party of Nevada), New Jersey, New Mexico, North Dakota, Pennsylvania, South Carolina, South Dakota, Utah, Washington, West Virginia, Wisconsin, Wyoming, with write-in status in Alabama, Delaware, Georgia, Indiana, Maine, New Hampshire, Ohio, Oregon, Rhode Island, Texas, and Vermont. The campaign is attempting to gain write-in status in Arizona, California, Connecticut, Illinois, Kansas, Kentucky, Maryland, Massachusetts, Montana, Nebraska, New York, North Carolina, Tennessee, and Virginia.

Campaign funds
From April 1 to June 30, the campaign had $0 in federal funds, $3,778 in Itemized Individual Contributions, $4,012 in Unitemized Individual Contributions for a total of $7,789, with $2,500 in Candidate Loans for a total of $10,289 in receipts. In Disbursements, the Operating Expenditures totaled up to $7,313.

Political positions
The campaign's main objective is to adhere to the United States Constitution, citing it as a "charter of liberty for the American Republic".

Castle advocates for the end of the Federal Reserve by repealing the Federal Reserve Act and letting lenders and borrowers set interest rates instead, adding that banks would no longer depend on the Reserve to lend them money in an emergency. He also advocates the U.S. Treasury to accept any major currency such as bitcoin and gold.

Castle believes in the United States withdrawing from the United Nations in order to regain sovereignty, freedom, and independence, citing the U.N. as a "church of unbelieving humanism" that is in "direct opposition to the ideas of America" and "an affront to liberty and human dignity". He also supports getting out of NATO, North American Free Trade Agreement (NAFTA), Trans-Pacific Partnership (TPP), Dominican Republic–Central America Free Trade Agreement (CAFTA-DR), General Agreement on Tariffs and Trade (GATT), and the World Trade Organization (WTO).

Castle asserted that he is the only candidate in any party to be 100% opposed to abortion rights, stating that unborn persons have rights to live in part due to the 5th Amendment and 14th Amendment. He supports vetoing any attempt to spend money to fund Planned Parenthood and other abortion providers along with taking away the power of the Supreme Court to preside over the matter via recommendation and collaboration with Congress.

Like the party's platform, the campaign is opposed to gun control of any kind. They also oppose any attempt to go to war without a declaration of war by Congress under Article I, Section 8 of the Constitution. The platform also rejects letting women train or participate in combat due to the practices of dual qualification standards and forced integration undermining the "integrity, morale, performance" of the military organizations.

Citing the 10th Amendment, the campaign supports the right of parents to provide for the education of their children, opposing any federal involvement in education.

Castle advocates for the replacement of the current tax system with a "tariff based revenue system supplemented by excise taxes", along with repealing the 16th Amendment and abolishing the Internal Revenue Service.

Citing James Madison, the platform and campaign favor a moratorium on immigration to the United States until proper security procedures and the discontinuation of all federal subsidies and assistance, except under extreme circumstances. They also reject giving citizenship to children of immigrants born in the country, extension of amnesty and bilingual ballots along with supporting English as the official language for all government business.

Polling

Statewide

Nevada
Five-way race

South Dakota
Four-way race

Utah
Six-way race

Endorsements
People
Chuck Baldwin, 2008 Constitution Party Presidential Candidate
Matthew Carr, writer at Liberty Hangout
Sam Bushman, The host of Liberty Roundtable
Dan Phillips MD, Professor of Psychiatry
Rebecca Kiessling, International Pro-Life Speaker

Organizations
Georgia Right to Life, An anti-abortion Political Action Committee

References

External links
 Official campaign site
 Constitution Party site

Castle, Darrell
Castle, Darrell
Constitution Party (United States)